Harold Perkins (born 2004) is an American football outside linebacker for the LSU Tigers. He was rated by ESPN as the No. 4 prospect in the 2022 college football recruiting class.

Early years and recruiting
Perkins was born in New Orleans, Louisiana, but his family was displaced by Hurricane Katrina a year after his birth. Perkins’ mother, Bertha Walton, grandmother, and aunt attempted to gather the family elsewhere in New Orelans, but the storm was too much. They eventually climbed through two houses to seek refuge in the hallway of their neighbor’s home until Perkins' uncle evacuated the family in a 2004 Chevrolet Blazer. 17 members of the family would evacuate to Texas soon after.

Perkins grew up in Cypress, Texas and played high school football and basketball at Cypress Park High School. Perkins played linebacker and running back, earning first team All-Greater Houston as a utility player on offense. He was rated No. 4 nationally and No. 1 at the linebacker position in ESPN's rankings of the 2022 college football recruiting class. He originally committed to Texas A&M, then decommitted, and ultimately signed with LSU. He was the top recruit in LSU's 2022 recruiting class. Between 2009 and 2022, Perkins was one of at least 26 LSU football players who were displaced by Katrina during or before their freshman year in college. Others included Grant Delpit, Saahdiq Charles, and Leonard Fournette.

LSU Tigers

2022
Perkins won a starting spot at linebacker as a freshman in the fall of 2022. In LSU's upset victory over Alabama, he registered seven pressures and was selected as the SEC Defensive Player of the Week. After the game, LSU coach Brian Kelly said of Perkins: "He's a bit of a throwback, and a throwback in this sense, 'just tell me what to do. I don't need all the other things. And I'll figure it out as I go.'" In week 10 against Arkansas, in a performance described as “dominating”, Perkins tied the LSU single-game record for quarterback sacks with four and forced two fumbles, including the game winner. Following the Arkansas game, Perkins was selected as the SEC Defensive Player of the Week for the second week in a row as well as the Walter Camp Defensive Player of the Week. Through the first ten games of the 2022 season, Perkins totaled 52 tackles, 7.5 sacks, two forced fumbles, and an interception. At the end of the season, he was named to Pro Football Focus's PFF True Freshman All-America team.

References

Living people
2004 births
People from Cypress, Texas
Sportspeople from Harris County, Texas
Players of American football from Texas
American football linebackers
LSU Tigers football players